The National Association of Fire Investigators (NAFI) is a professional association of people who investigate cases of fire and arson.  It was created in 1961 and is located in Bradenton, Florida.  The purpose of the group is to increase knowledge and improve skills of fire investigators in the field and in relation to the litigation involved in determining the origin and cause of fires.

NAFI offers three certifications for its members through its own National Certification Board.  The National Fire Protection Association's guide to fire investigation, known as NFPA 921 recognizes the certifications awarded by NAFI.  Through NAFI, members can become a Certified Fire and Explosion Investigator (CFEI), a Certified Fire Investigation Instructor (CFII), or a Certified Vehicle Fire Investigator (CVFI).

External links
National Association of Fire Investigators - Official Website
Certified Fire & Explosion Investigators/Certified Vehicle Fire Investigators/Certified Fire Investigation Instructors

Firefighters associations in the United States
Firefighting in the United States
Fire investigation
Organizations established in 1961
Bradenton, Florida